Nottingham Arkwright Street was a railway station in Nottingham on the former Great Central Main Line which ran from Manchester Piccadilly to London Marylebone. The station opened with the line in 1899 and closed in 1963 as part of rationalisation; it reopened four years later upon the closure of Nottingham Victoria railway station, only to close in 1969.

History

Opening 
Nottingham Arkwright Street was built by the Great Central Railway and opened in 1899. It formed part of the long approach viaducts to the south of the city, running from Queen's Walk Yard to Thurland Street Tunnel. As a result of being atop the viaducts, it was one of only two examples of the original intermediate stations (together with Carrington) on the Great Central's London Extension not to be constructed to the favoured island platform design which facilitated future development. Arkwright Street was instead built with twin side wooden platforms which were cantilevered out from the viaduct and approached by steps leading up from Arkwright Street.

Whilst the line was only double track through Arkwright Street, immediately to the south for a distance of some half a mile the railway was quadrupled. A carriage shed and locomotive depot, including a shed capable of accommodating 16 engines, were constructed on the up side, and a warehouse and goods, coal and timber yards on the down side. The engine shed closed in 1909 due to the higher water rates imposed by Nottingham City, with locomotives moved to the larger Annesley shed to the north of the city. From Queen's Walk Yard there was also a short branch line to Clifton colliery.

Passenger services commenced on the Great Central on 15 March 1899 with Arkwright Street as the line's temporary northern terminus pending the completion of Nottingham Victoria.

Decline and closure 

The more centrally-situated Nottingham Victoria was to supersede Arkwright Street which was to close in 1963 having been recommended for closure in the Beeching Report along with many other local stations on the route.

In 1966, however, the Great Central Main Line was closed as a through-route, with the only passenger trains to be retained being a DMU service between Nottingham and Rugby. Consequently, British Rail closed Nottingham Victoria station in 1967 (selling the lucrative city centre property for redevelopment), and hence Arkwright Street station was hastily reopened (one platform only) to provide the northern terminus of this truncated route. The station was served by six DMUs mainly during peak hours.

All passenger trains on the line were withdrawn in May 1969, and Arkwright Street station consequently closed on a permanent basis. Goods trains continued to pass through until 1973.

Present day 
The station and viaducts carrying the railway were demolished around 1975 and the area was comprehensively redeveloped leaving no trace of the railway that ran through the Meadows.

The Great Central Railway (heritage railway) have hope of extending their current terminus at Ruddington Fields to Ruddington. However, they do not plan to reopen the line towards Nottingham Arkwright Street. Mostly in part due to the Nottingham Tram running on the line and station site at Arkwright Street has been built over and used for road alignments.

External links

References 

Disused railway stations in Nottinghamshire
Former Great Central Railway stations
Railway stations in Great Britain opened in 1899
Railway stations in Great Britain closed in 1963
Railway stations in Great Britain opened in 1967
Railway stations in Great Britain closed in 1969
Beeching closures in England